Amatemi (Love Me) is a 2005 Italian drama film written and directed by Renato De Maria.

Cast 
Isabella Ferrari as Nina
Pierfrancesco Favino as  Claudio
Donatella Finocchiaro as  Giulia
Branko Đurić as Drazen
Valerio Mastandrea as Andrea
Camilla Filippi as  Camilla
Marco Giallini as  The Married Man
Giampaolo Morelli as Jogging instructor
 as Paul
 as David
 as Hotel Porter
Giampaolo Morelli as the running trainer

References

External links

  
2005 films
2005 drama films
Italian drama films
2000s Italian-language films
2000s Italian films